Isma'il Pasha (12 January 1830 – 2 March 1895) was the Khedive of Egypt and conqueror of Sudan from 1863 to 1879, when he was removed at the behest of Great Britain. Sharing the ambitious outlook of his grandfather, Muhammad Ali Pasha, he greatly modernized Egypt and Sudan during his reign, investing heavily in industrial and economic development, urbanization, and the expansion of the country's boundaries in Africa.

His philosophy can be glimpsed in a statement that he made in 1879: "My country is not longer only in Africa; we are now part of Europe, too. It is therefore natural for us to abandon our former ways and to adopt a new system adapted to our social conditions".

In 1867 he also secured Ottoman and international recognition for his title of Khedive (Viceroy) in preference to Wāli (Governor) which was previously used by his predecessors in the Eyalet of Egypt and Sudan (1517–1867). However, Isma'il's policies placed the Khedivate of Egypt and Sudan (1867–1914) in severe debt, leading to the sale of the country's shares in the Suez Canal Company to the British government, and his ultimate toppling from power in 1879 under British and French pressure.

The city of Ismailia is named in his honor.

Family
The second of the three sons of Ibrahim Pasha, and the grandson of Muhammad Ali, Ismail, of Albanian descent, was born in Cairo at Al Musafir Khana Palace. His mother was Circassian Hoshiyar Qadin, third wife of his father.

Youth and education
After receiving a European education in Paris where he attended the École d'état-major, he returned home, and on the death of his elder brother became heir to his uncle, Said I, the Wāli and Khedive of Egypt and Sudan. Said, who apparently conceived his safety to lie in ridding himself as much as possible of the presence of his nephew, employed him in the next few years on missions abroad, notably to the Pope, the Emperor Napoleon III, and the Sultan of the Ottoman Empire. In 1861 he was dispatched at the head of an army of 18,000 to quell an insurrection in Sudan, a mission which he accomplished.

Khedive of Egypt
After the death of Said, Ismail was proclaimed Khedive on 19 January 1863, though the Ottoman Empire and the other Great Powers recognized him only as Wāli. Like all Egyptian and Sudanese rulers since his grandfather Muhammad Ali Pasha, he claimed the higher title of Khedive, which the Ottoman Porte had consistently refused to sanction. Finally, in 1867, Isma'il succeeded in persuading the Ottoman Sultan Abdülaziz to grant a firman finally recognizing him as Khedive in exchange for an increase in the tribute, because of the Khedive's help in the Cretan Revolt between 1866 and 1869. Another firman changed the law of succession to direct descent from father to son rather than brother to brother, and a further decree in 1873 confirmed the virtual independence of the Khedivate of Egypt from the Porte.

Reforms
Ismail spent heavily—some went to bribes to Constantinople to facilitate his reform projects. Much of the money went for the construction of the Suez Canal. About £46 million went to construct  of irrigation canals to help modernize agriculture. He built over  railroads,  of telegraph lines, 400 bridges, harbor works in Alexandria, and 4,500 schools.  The national debt rose from £3 million to about £90 million, in a country with 5 million population and an annual treasury revenue of about £8 million.

Ismail launched vast schemes of internal reform on the scale of his grandfather, remodeling the customs system and the post office, stimulating commercial progress, creating a sugar industry, building the cotton industry, building palaces, entertaining lavishly, and maintaining an opera and a theatre. Over one hundred thousand Europeans came to work in Cairo, where he facilitated building an entire new quarter of the city on its western edge modeled on Paris. Alexandria was also improved. He launched a vast railroad building project that saw Egypt and Sudan rise from having virtually none to the most railways per habitable kilometer of any nation in the world.

Education reform increased the education budget more than tenfold. Traditional primary and secondary schools were expanded and specialized technical and vocational schools were created. Students were once again sent to Europe to study on educational missions, encouraging the formation of a Western-trained elite. A national library was founded in 1871.

One of his most significant achievements was to establish an assembly of delegates in November 1866. Though this was supposed to be a purely advisory body, its members eventually came to have an important influence on governmental affairs. Village headmen dominated the assembly and came to exert increasing political and economic influence over the countryside and the central government. This was shown in 1876 when the assembly persuaded Ismail to reinstate the law (enacted by him in 1871 to raise money and later repealed) that allowed landownership and tax privileges to persons paying six years' land tax in advance.

Ismail tried to reduce slave trading and with the advice and financial backing of Yacoub Cattaui extended Egypt's rule in Africa. In 1874 he annexed Darfur, but was prevented from expanding into Ethiopia after his army was repeatedly defeated by Emperor Yohannes IV, first at Gundat on 16 November 1875, and again at Gura in March of the following year.

War with Ethiopia

Ismail dreamt of expanding his realm across the entire Nile including its diverse sources, and over the whole African coast of the Red Sea. This, together with rumours about rich raw material and fertile soil, led Ismail to expansive policies directed against Ethiopia under the Emperor Yohannes IV. In 1865 the Ottoman Sublime Porte ceded the Ottoman Province of Habesh (with Massawa and Suakin at the Red Sea as the main cities of that province) to Ismail. This province, which neighboured Ethiopia, first consisted of a coastal strip only but expanded subsequently inland into territory controlled by the Ethiopian ruler. Here Ismail occupied regions originally claimed by the Ottomans when they had established the province (eyaleti) of Habesh in the 16th century. New economically promising projects, like huge cotton plantations in the Barka delta, were started. In 1872 Bogos (with the city of Keren) was annexed by the governor of the new "Province of Eastern Sudan and the Red Sea Coast", Werner Munzinger Pasha. In October 1875 Ismail's army try to occupied the adjacent highlands of Hamasien, which were then tributary to the Ethiopian Emperor, and suffered defeat at the battle of Gundit. 
In March 1876 Ismail's army tried again and suffered a second dramatic defeat by Yohannes's army at Gura'. Ismail's son Hassan was captured by the Ethiopians and only released after a large ransom. This was followed by a long cold war, only finishing in 1884 with the Anglo-Egyptian-Ethiopian Hewett Treaty, when Bogos was given back to Ethiopia. The Red Sea Province created by Ismail and his governor Munzinger Pasha was taken over by the Italians shortly thereafter and became the territorial basis for the Colony of Eritrea (proclaimed in 1890).

Suez Canal

Ismail's khedivate is closely connected to the building of the Suez Canal. He agreed to, and oversaw, the Egyptian portion of its construction. On his accession, at the behest of Yacoub Cattaui his minister of Finance and close advisor, he refused to ratify the concessions to the Canal company made by Said, and the question was referred in 1864 to the arbitration of Napoleon III, who awarded £3,800,000 to the company as compensation for the losses they would incur by the changes which Ismail insisted upon in the original grant. Ismail then used every available means, by his own undoubted powers of fascination and by judicious expenditure, to bring his personality before the foreign sovereigns and public, and he had much success. In 1867 he visited Paris during the Exposition Universelle (1867) with Sultan Abdülaziz, and also London, where he was received by Queen Victoria and welcomed by the Lord Mayor. Whilst in Britain he also saw a British Royal Navy Fleet Review with the Ottoman Sultan. In 1869 he again paid a visit to Britain. When the Canal finally opened, Ismail held a festival of unprecedented scope, most of it financed by the Cattaui banking house, from whom he borrowed $1,000,000, inviting dignitaries from around the world.

Debts
These developments – especially the costly war with Ethiopia – left Egypt in deep debt to the European powers, and they used this position to wring concessions out of Ismail.  One of the most unpopular among Egyptians and Sudanese was the new system of mixed courts, by which Europeans were tried by judges from their own states, rather than by Egyptian and Sudanese courts. But at length the inevitable financial crisis came. A national debt of over £100 million sterling (as opposed to three millions when he acceded to the throne) had been incurred by the Khedive, whose fundamental idea of liquidating his borrowings was to borrow at increased interest. The bond-holders became restive, chief among them the House of Cattaui. Judgments were given against the Khedive in the international tribunals. When he could raise no more loans, he sold the Egyptian and Sudanese shares in the Suez Canal Company in 1875 with the assistance of Yacoub Cattaui to the British government for £3,976,582; this was immediately followed by the beginning of direct intervention by the Great Powers in Egypt and Sudan.

In December 1875, Stephen Cave and John Stokes were sent out by the British government to inquire into the finances of Egypt, and in April 1876 their report was published, advising that in view of the waste and extravagance it was necessary for foreign Powers to interfere in order to restore credit. The result was the establishment of the Caisse de la Dette. A subsequent investigation in October by George Goschen and Joubert resulted in the establishment of joint Anglo-French control over most of the Egyptian government's finances. A further commission of inquiry by Major Evelyn Baring (afterwards 1st Earl of Cromer) and others in 1878 culminated in Ismail handing over much of his personal estates' to the nation and accepting the position of a constitutional sovereign, with Nubar as premier, Charles Rivers Wilson as finance minister, and de Blignières as minister of public works.

As the historian Eugene Rogan has observed, "the irony of the situation was that Egypt had embarked on its development schemes to secure independence from Ottoman and European domination. Yet with each new concession, the government of Egypt made itself more vulnerable to European encroachment."

Khedive's Somali Coast

The jurisdiction of Ismail Pasha from the 1870s until 1884 included the entire northern coast of Somalia, up to the eastern coast at Ras Hafun in contemporary Puntland. The Khedive's northern Somali Coast territory was reached as far inland as Harrar, although it was subsequently ceded to Britain in 1884 due to internal difficulties of Egypt.

Relinquishment and subsequent treaties
The relinquishment of the territories by Ismail Pasha was followed by treaties with European powers:

The first Somali chieftains to sign a treaty with the British Political Resident at Aden, Frederick Mercer Hunter were Abdillah Liban and Jamah Yunus of the Habar Awal tribe on the 14th July 1884. A memorandum for British treaties was issued  16th July 1886, as follows, with the most comprehensive treaty concluded with the Garhajis and Habar Jeclo tribes containing the additional commitments of "render assistance" to vessels and forbidding diplomacy with non-British officials:

The  Somali tribes whose chiefs were signatories who  aligned with colonial powers via treaties of obligations and impositions, including Habar Awal, Habar Jeclo, Gadabuursi, Eesa, Majeerteen and Garhajis and Rahanweyn. In order to ensure Somali obedience to Europeans colonists and their treaties, European powers promoted a culture of enmeshment in Somali populace, in the youth vis-a-vis their elders and in the laymen vis-a-vis their chieftains. The treatymakers, composed of chieftains of these clans, signed the treaties.

Although Warsangeli signed a treaty in 1886, according to Cordeaux, he detached from acknowledging this Warsangeli obligation. According to Roy Irons, this was because of Warsangeli support of Dervish in the mid 1900s:

Urabi Revolt and exile

This control of the country by Europeans was unacceptable to many Egyptians, who united behind a disaffected Colonel Ahmed Urabi. The Urabi Revolt consumed Egypt. Hoping the revolt could relieve him of European control, Ismail did little to oppose Urabi and gave into his demands to dissolve the government. Britain and France took the matter seriously, and insisted in May 1879 on the reinstatement of the British and French ministers. With the country largely in the hands of Urabi, Ismail could not agree, and had little interest in doing so. As a result, the British, and French governments pressured the Ottoman Sultan Abdülhamid II to depose Ismail Pasha, and this was done on 26 June 1879. The more pliable Tewfik Pasha, Ismail's eldest son, was made his successor. Ismail Pasha left Egypt and initially went into exile to Resina, today Ercolano near Naples, until 1885 when he was eventually permitted by Sultan Abdülhamid II to retire to his palace in Emirgan on the Bosporus in Constantinople. There he remained, more or less a state prisoner, until his death. According to TIME magazine, he died while trying to guzzle two bottles of champagne in one draft. He was later buried in Cairo.

Legacy

Although as the Khedive, Ismail spoke Turkish and could not speak Arabic, under his reign, Arabic use gradually increased at the expense of Turkish, which had been the language of the ruling elite in the Nile delta for hundreds of years. In the following decades Arabic would further expand and eventually replace Turkish in the army and administration, leaving Turkish only to be used in correspondence with the Ottoman Sultan in Constantinople.

Honours
 Order of Glory, Nichan Iftikhar
 Grand Cordon (civil) of the Order of Leopold, 10 February 1863
 Order of Nobility, Special Class, 1863
 Order of Osmanieh, Special class, 1863
 Grand Cross of the Imperial Order of Leopold, 1864
 Grand Cross of the Imperial Order of the Mexican Eagle, 1865
 Commander Grand Cross of the Order of the Sword, 27 July 1866
 Honorary Grand Cross (civil) of the Order of the Bath, 18 December 1866
 Grand Cross of the Order of the Netherlands Lion, 1866
 Knight of the Supreme Order of the Most Holy Annunciation, 29 January 1867
 Grand Cross of the Legion d'Honneur, 1867
 Honorary Grand Commander of the Order of the Star of India, 27 August 1868
 Knight of the Order of the Black Eagle, 30 December 1868
 Grand Cross of the Order of the Red Eagle, 3 April 1865
 Grand Cross of the Order of the Dannebrog, 3 November 1869
 Grand Cross of the Order of Saints Maurice and Lazarus, 1869
 Grand Cross of the Order of the Crown of Italy, 1869
 Grand Cross of the Order of the Redeemer, 1869
 Grand Cross of the Order of St. Stephen, 1869
   Grand Cross of the Saxe-Ernestine House Order, 1872
 Honorary member: Bavarian Academy of Sciences and Humanities, 1874
 Grand Cross of the House and Merit Order of Peter Frederick Louis, with Golden Crown, 5 February 1875
 Order of the Brilliant Star of Zanzibar, 1st Class, 1875
 Order of the Brilliant Star of Egypt, 1st Class, 1875

Further reading

Dye, William McEntyre. Moslem Egypt and Christian Abyssinia; Or, Military Service Under the Khedive, in his Provinces and Beyond their Borders, as Experienced by the American Staff. New York: Atkin & Prout (1880).
Helen Chapin Metz. Egypt: A Country Study. Washington: GPO for the Library of Congress, 1990., Helen Chapin Metz, ed.

Notes

References

Official Presidential web site of Egypt

External links
 

 
 
 

Muhammad Ali dynasty
1830 births
1895 deaths
19th-century Egyptian monarchs
19th-century prime ministers of Egypt
Burials in Egypt
Commanders Grand Cross of the Order of the Sword
Egyptian people of Albanian descent
Egyptian people of Circassian descent
Grand Croix of the Légion d'honneur
Grand Crosses of the Order of the Dannebrog
Honorary Knights Grand Commander of the Order of the Star of India
Honorary Knights Grand Cross of the Order of the Bath
Khedives of Egypt
Knights Grand Cross of the Order of Saints Maurice and Lazarus
Ottoman governors of Egypt
People from the Ottoman Empire of Circassian descent
Royalty from Cairo
Recipients of the Order of the Netherlands Lion
Suez Canal
Egyptian Freemasons
Grand Crosses of the Order of Saint Stephen of Hungary
Slave owners